Kadov may refer to places in the Czech Republic:

Kadov (Strakonice District)
Kadov (Žďár nad Sázavou District) 
Kadov (Znojmo District)